Wundschuh is a municipality in the district of Graz-Umgebung in the Austrian state of Styria.

Geography 
Wundschuh lies in the Graz basin in the Kaiser forest about 12 km south of Graz.

Subdivisions
Katastralgemeinden are Kasten and Wundschuh. Other communities are Forst, pop. 122, Gradenfeld, pop. 176, Kasten, pop. 319, Ponigl, pop. 104, and Wundschuh, pop, 676.

References

Cities and towns in Graz-Umgebung District